Mark Rawle (born 27 April 1979) is a former professional footballer. His last club was Southern League Premier Division side Brackley Town after being released from Conference North side Tamworth. He played in the Football League for Southend United, Oxford United and Kidderminster Harriers.

External links

Kettering release Rawle

1979 births
Living people
Footballers from Leicester
Association football forwards
English footballers
Rushden & Diamonds F.C. players
Boston United F.C. players
Southend United F.C. players
Oxford United F.C. players
Tamworth F.C. players
Kidderminster Harriers F.C. players
Woking F.C. players
Ebbsfleet United F.C. players
Alfreton Town F.C. players
Kettering Town F.C. players
Brackley Town F.C. players
Redditch United F.C. players
English Football League players
Southern Football League players
National League (English football) players